Shane Steichen (born May 11, 1985) is an American football coach who is the head coach for the Indianapolis Colts of the National Football League (NFL). He previously served as an assistant coach for the San Diego / Los Angeles Chargers from 2014 to 2020, most recently as an offensive coordinator in 2020 prior to serving in the same capacity for the Philadelphia Eagles. Steichen also previously served as an assistant coach for the Cleveland Browns.

Playing career
Steichen was a four-year letterman as quarterback at the University of Nevada, Las Vegas (UNLV) from 2003 to 2006. His best performance was during his senior year when he came off the bench at the end of the first quarter and tied a UNLV record by throwing five touchdown passes in regulation time in a 39–36 overtime loss to New Mexico at Sam Boyd Stadium on October 14, 2006. Steichen finished his collegiate career with 2,755 yards and 22 touchdowns. He registered 399 rushing yards and five touchdowns.

Coaching career

San Diego Chargers
In 2011, Steichen was hired by the San Diego Chargers as a defensive assistant.

Cleveland Browns
In 2013, Steichen was hired by the Cleveland Browns as an offensive quality control coach under head coach Rob Chudzinski. He assisted the quarterbacks as an offensive quality control coach with the Cleveland Browns. Despite multiple injuries at the position, the Browns had three starting quarterbacks (Jason Campbell, Brian Hoyer and Brandon Weeden) each post 300-yard passing performances for the first time in franchise history (sixth instance in NFL history).

San Diego / Los Angeles Chargers (second stint)
From 2014-15, Steichen served as an offensive quality control coach for the Chargers and worked primarily with the wide receivers. In 2015, Keenan Allen played in the first eight games of the season and caught 67 passes for 725 yards and four touchdowns before being placed on the team's season-ending Injured Reserve list. In 2014, San Diego had four players, including three wide receivers (Keenan Allen, Eddie Royal and Malcom Floyd), reach 50+ receptions for just the fourth time in team history. 

In 2016, he was promoted to quarterbacks coach. Over the next four seasons, Philip Rivers ranked second in passing yards (17,824), fourth in completions (1,446) and fourth in touchdown passes (116). He was selected to three consecutive Pro Bowls from 2016-18.

In 2016, Rivers registered the second-most passing touchdowns of his career (33) while completing 349-of-578 passes for 4,386 yards.

As the league's top ranked passing offense in 2017 (276.9 yards per game), Rivers completed 360-of-575 passes for 4,515 yards with 28 touchdowns and 10 interceptions for a 96.0 passer rating. 

On October 30, 2019, Steichen was promoted to interim offensive coordinator by the Los Angeles Chargers after the team fired Ken Whisenhunt. During his tenure as play caller, the unit ranked fifth in the league in total yards per game (384.3), sixth in passing yards per game (272.1) and seventh in third down percentage (42.7 percent). 

In 2020, Steichen was promoted to full-time offensive coordinator. Steichen worked with quarterback Justin Herbert, whom the team selected with the sixth overall pick of the 2020 NFL Draft. The 2020 Associated Press Offensive Rookie of the Year completed 396-of-595 passes for 4,336 yards with 31 touchdowns with 10 interceptions for a 98.3 passer rating. Herbert set NFL rookie records in completions and passing touchdowns, while registering the second-most passing yards by a rookie in league history (Andrew Luck – 4,374). He finished in the top 10 in the league in completions (fourth), passing yards (sixth) and passing touchdowns (10th). Additionally, wide receiver Keenan Allen caught 100 passes for 992 yards and eight touchdowns en route to Pro Bowl honors.

In Steichen's first full season as the Chargers' offensive coordinator, Los Angeles finished in the top 10 in yards per game (382.1 – ninth), passing yards per game (270.6 – sixth), first downs per game (23.3 – sixth), third down percentage (44.2 percent – ninth) and fewest turnovers (16 – tied-fourth).

Philadelphia Eagles
On January 25, 2021, Steichen was hired by the Philadelphia Eagles as their offensive coordinator under head coach Nick Sirianni. Steichen was instrumental in the development of QB Jalen Hurts, who completed 265-of-432 passes for 3,144 yards with 16 touchdowns and nine interceptions for an 87.2 passer rating in his first season as a starter. Hurts also registered 784 rushing yards and 10 touchdowns. He became just the eighth quarterback in NFL history to register 3,000 passing yards and 750 rushing yards in a season. Hurts also became the youngest Eagles quarterback to ever start in a playoff game.

DeVonta Smith, whom the team selected with the 10th overall pick of the 2021 NFL Draft, registered 64 receptions for 916 yards and five touchdowns. He set the franchise rookie record in receiving yards. Tight end Dallas Goedert totaled 56 receptions for 830 yards and four touchdowns. Goedert's 830 receiving yards were a single-season career high and ranked fifth in the league among tight ends. Steichen also helped Jason Kelce (First Team) and Lane Johnson (Second Team) each earn Associated Press All-Pro recognition. Kelce was also selected to the Pro Bowl.

In his first season in Philadelphia, Steichen orchestrated the NFL's most productive rushing offense, as the Eagles led the league with a franchise-record 2,715 rushing yards. Philadelphia ranked fourth in third down percentage (then-team-record 45.7 percent), eighth in red zone percentage (62.3 percent) and fifth in fewest turnovers (16).

In 2022, he guided a Philadelphia offense that finished in the top 10 in numerous categories, including yards per game (389.1 – third), points per game (28.1 – third), rushing yards per game (147.6 – fifth), passing yards per game (241.5 – ninth), fewest turnovers (19 – tied-fifth), first downs per game (22.6 – third), third down percentage (franchise-record 45.95 percent – fourth), fourth down percentage (68.75 percent – fourth), red zone percentage (67.80 percent – third), goal to go percentage (82.35 percent – fifth), points scored on their first offensive possession (62 – first) and plays of 10+ yards (253 – second). The Eagles were one of just two teams to finish in the top 10 in rushing yards per game and passing yards per game.

Steichen worked with quarterback Jalen Hurts, who set single-season career highs in every passing category, including completions (306), passing yards (3,701), passing touchdowns (22), completion percentage (66.5) and passer rating (101.5). Hurts also had a team high and single-season career-high 13 rushing touchdowns. He finished fourth in the NFL in passer rating and 10th in passing yards.

Philadelphia was one of just two teams to have two 1,000-yard receivers (A.J. Brown and DeVonta Smith) as well as a 1,000-yard rusher (Miles Sanders). In his first season with Philadelphia, Brown established single-season career highs in receptions (88) and receiving yards (1,496), while tying his single-season career high in receiving touchdowns (11). Smith also had a career year as he caught 95 passes for 1,196 yards and seven touchdowns (all single-season career highs). Brown (fourth) and Smith (ninth) each ranked in the top 10 in receiving yards and Brown tied for third in receiving touchdowns. Sanders finished fifth in the league in rushing after registering 259 carries for 1,269 yards (4.9 avg.) and 11 touchdowns (all single-season career highs).

The Eagles led the NFL with eight total Pro Bowl selections in 2022, which included six on offense in A.J. Brown, Landon Dickerson, Jalen Hurts, Lane Johnson, Jason Kelce and Miles Sanders. Additionally, Lane Johnson (First Team), Jason Kelce (First Team), A.J. Brown (Second Team) and Jalen Hurts (Second Team) each earned Associated Press All-Pro honors.

During his two seasons as offensive coordinator, Steichen coordinated an offense that ranked first in the NFL in rushing yards per game (153.6), rushing yards (5,224) and rushing touchdowns (57) over that time frame. Philadelphia also ranked tied for first in fewest interceptions (19) and third in fourth down conversion percentage (58.92 percent). Additionally, the Eagles offense set new single-season franchise records in third down conversion percentage in back-to-back seasons.

Indianapolis Colts
On February 14, 2023, Steichen was hired by the Indianapolis Colts as their head coach.

Head coaching record

Personal life 
A native of Sacramento, California, Steichen earned his degree in journalism and media studies from UNLV. He attended Oak Ridge High School in El Dorado Hills, Calif., and earned area MVP honors from the Sacramento Bee after leading his squad to a conference sectional title in 2002.

Steichen and his wife, Nina, have a son, Hudson, and a daughter, Stella. Steichen's older brother, Sean, was a punter at Boise State.

References

External links
 Indianapolis Colts bio

1985 births
Living people
American football quarterbacks 
Cleveland Browns coaches
Indianapolis Colts head coaches
Los Angeles Chargers coaches
Louisville Cardinals football coaches 
National Football League offensive coordinators
Philadelphia Eagles coaches
Players of American football from Sacramento, California
San Diego Chargers coaches
UNLV Rebels football players